The 2015 Montreal Impact season was the club's 22nd season of existence, and their fourth in Major League Soccer, the top tier of the Canadian soccer pyramid. They advanced to the conference semifinals, where they lost to the Columbus Crew.

Outside of MLS regular season play, the club participated in the 2015 Canadian Championship, as well as the knockout stages of the 2014–15 CONCACAF Champions League.

Background

Transfers

In

Out

Loans in

Loans out

International caps 
Players called for senior international duty during the 2015 season while under contract with the Montreal Impact.

Pre-Season Friendlies

Major League Soccer

Review

Tables

Eastern Conference

Overall

Results summary

Fixtures & results

MLS Cup Playoffs

CONCACAF Champions League 

The 2015 CONCACAF Champions League Finals was the final of the 2014–15 CONCACAF Champions League, the 7th edition of the CONCACAF Champions League under its current format, and overall the 50th edition of the premium football club competition organized by CONCACAF, the regional governing body of North America, Central America, and the Caribbean.

CONCACAF Champions League review

CONCACAF Champions League results

Canadian championship

Canadian Championship review

Canadian Championship results

Player information

Squad information

Squad and statistics

Appearances, minutes played, and goals scored

Top Scorers 

{| class="wikitable sortable alternance"  style="font-size:85%; text-align:center; line-height:14px; width:60%;"
|-
!width=10|No.
!width=10|Nat.
! scope="col" style="width:275px;"|Player
!width=10|Pos.
!width=80|Major League Soccer
!width=80|Canadian Championship
!width=80|CONCACAF Champions League
!width=80|MLS Cup Playoffs
!width=80|TOTAL
|-
|10||  || Ignacio Piatti                || MF ||9 ||  ||2 ||1 ||12
|-
|11||  || Didier Drogba                    || FW || 11 ||  || ||1 ||12
|-
|7||  || Dominic Oduro                || FW ||8  || 1 || || || 9
|-
|99||  || Jack McInerney                || FW ||4 || 1 ||2 || ||7
|-
|15||  || Andrés Romero                || MF || 4 ||  ||2 || ||6
|-
|5||  || Dilly Duka                    || MF || 2 ||  ||2 || 1||5
|-
|23||  || Laurent Ciman                || DF || 2 || 1|| || ||3
|-
|8||  || Patrice Bernier                || MF ||  ||  || ||2 ||2
|-
|27||  || Johan Venegas                || MF || 1 || || ||1 ||2
|-
|55||  || Wandrille Lefèvre                || DF || 2 ||  || || ||2
|-
|2||  || Ambroise Oyongo                || DF || 1 ||  || || ||1
|-
|13||  || Kenny Cooper                || FW ||  ||1  || || ||1
|-
|18||  || Kyle Bekker                || MF ||  1||  || || ||1
|-
|24||  || Anthony Jackson-Hamel                || FW ||  ||1  || || ||1
|-
|25||  || Donny Toia                || DF || 1 || || || ||1
|-
|33||  || Marco Donadel                || MF || 1 || || || ||1
|-
|36||  || Víctor Cabrera                || DF ||  ||  ||1 || ||1
|-
|39||  || Cameron Porter                || FW ||  ||  ||1 || ||1
|-
|51||  || Maxim Tissot                || MF || 1 ||  || || ||1
|-
|- class="sortbottom"
| colspan="4"|Totals|| 46 || 5 ||10 || 6 ||67

Italic: denotes player left the club during the season.

Top assists 

{| class="wikitable sortable alternance"  style="font-size:85%; text-align:center; line-height:14px; width:60%;"
|-
!width=10|No.
!width=10|Nat.
! scope="col" style="width:275px;"|Player
!width=10|Pos.
!width=80|Major League Soccer
!width=80|Canadian Championship
!width=80|CONCACAF Champions League
!width=80|MLS Cup Playoffs
!width=80|TOTAL
|-
|10||  || Ignacio Piatti                    || MF || 8 ||  ||3 || 1||12
|-
|33||  || Marco Donadel                    || MF || 5 || 1 ||1 ||1 ||8
|-
|16||  || Calum Mallace                 || MF || 3 ||1  ||1 || ||5
|-
|7||  || Dominic Oduro                 || FW ||  ||  ||4 || ||4
|-
|15||  || Andrés Romero                 || MF || 4 ||  || || ||4
|-
|8 ||  || Patrice Bernier                    || MF ||1  ||  ||1 ||1 ||3
|-
|14||  || Nigel Reo-Coker                 || MF ||2  || 1 || || ||3
|-
|23||  || Laurent Ciman                 || DF || 2 ||  || || 1||3
|-
|3||  || Eric Miller                 || DF ||  ||2  || || ||2
|-
|5 ||  || Dilly Duka                    || MF ||2  ||  || || ||2
|-
|36||  || Víctor Cabrera                   || DF ||  ||  ||1 || 1||2
|-
|1 ||  || Evan Bush                    || GK ||1  ||  || || ||1
|-
|11 ||  || Didier Drogba                    || FW || 1 ||  || || ||1
|-
|21||  || Justin Mapp                    || MF ||  || 1 || || ||1
|-
|25||  || Donny Toia                    || DF ||  ||  ||1 || ||1
|-
|99||  || Jack McInerney                    || FW ||  ||1  || || ||1
|-
|- class="sortbottom"
| colspan="4"|Totals|| 29 || 7 ||12 ||5||53

Italic: denotes player left the club during the season.

Top minutes played 

{| class="wikitable sortable alternance"  style="font-size:85%; text-align:center; line-height:14px; width:60%;"
|-
!width=10|No.
!width=10|Nat.
!scope="col" style="width:275px;"|Player
!width=10|Pos.
!width=80|Major League Soccer
!width=80|Canadian Championship
!width=80|CONCACAF Champions League
!width=80|MLS Cup Playoffs
!width=80|TOTAL
|-
|25||  || Donny Toia                   || DF || 2699||  180 || 520 || 300 ||3699
|-
|23||  || Laurent Ciman                || DF || 2405||  360 || 540 ||300 ||3605
|-
|1||  || |Evan Bush                    || GK || 2790||   || 450 ||300 ||3540
|-
|10||  || Ignacio Piatti               || MF || 2213|| 38 || 526 || 300 ||3077
|-
|14||  || Nigel Reo-Coker              || MF || 1873|| 249 || 521 || 184 ||2847
|-
|33||  || Marco Donadel                || MF || 2000 || 163 || 267  || 300 ||2730
|-
|7||  || Dominic Oduro                 || FW || 1671|| 318 || 511 || 67 ||2567
|-
|5||  || Dilly Duka                   || MF || 1779|| 160  || 447 || 178||2564
|-
|16||  || Calum Mallace                 || MF || 1808|| 229 || 329 ||162 ||2528
|-
|15||  || Víctor Cabrera || DF || 1730|| 30 || 340 || 300 ||2400
|-

Italic: denotes player left the club during the season.

Multi–goal games

Goals against average 

{| border="1" cellpadding="4" cellspacing="0" style="margin: 1em 1em 1em 1em 0; background: #f9f9f9; border: 1px #aaa solid; border-collapse: collapse; font-size: 95%; text-align: center;"
|-
| rowspan="2" style="width:1%; text-align:center;"|No.
| rowspan="2" style="width:70px; text-align:center;"|Nat.
| rowspan="2" style="width:44%; text-align:center;"|Player
| colspan="3" style="text-align:center;"|Total
| colspan="3" style="text-align:center;"|Major League Soccer
| colspan="3" style="text-align:center;"|Canadian Championship
| colspan="3" style="text-align:center;"|CONCACAF Champions League
| colspan="3" style="text-align:center;"|MLS Cup Playoffs
|-
|MIN
|GA
|GAA
|MIN
|GA
|GAA
|MIN
|GA
|GAA
|MIN
|GA
|GAA
|MIN
|GA
|GAA
|-
| style="text-align: right;" |1
|
| style="text-align: left;" |Evan Bush
|3540
|51
|1.29
|2790
|39
|1.26
|0
|0
|0.00
|450
|8
|1.60
|300
|4
|1.20
|-
| style="text-align: right;" |22
|
| style="text-align: left;" |Eric Kronberg
|630
|12
|1.71
|270
|5
|1.67
|360
|7
|1.75
|0
|0
|0.00
|0
|0
|0.00
|-
| style="text-align: right;" |30
|
| style="text-align: left;" |Kristian Nicht
|90
|4
|4.00
|0
|0
|0.00
|0
|0
|0.00
|90
|4
|4.00
|0
|0
|0.00
|-
| style="text-align: right;" |40
|
| style="text-align: left;" |Maxime Crépeau
|0
|0
|0.00
|0
|0
|0.00
|0
|0
|0.00
|0
|0
|0.00
|0
|0
|0.00
|-

Italic: denotes player left the club during the season.

Clean sheets 

{| class="wikitable sortable alternance"  style="font-size:85%; text-align:center; line-height:14px; width:60%;"
|-
!width=10|No.
!width=10|Nat.
! scope="col" style="width:275px;"|Player
!width=80|Major League Soccer
!width=80|Canadian Championship
!width=80|CONCACAF Champions League
!width=80|MLS Cup Playoffs
!width=80|TOTAL
|-
|1||  || Evan Bush                     || 9 ||   || 1 ||1 ||11
|-
|22||  || Eric Kronberg                     ||   || 1 ||   || ||1
|-
|- class="sortbottom"
| colspan="3"|Totals|| 9 || 1 || 1 || 1|| 12

Suspensions 

(Concacaf Match)
(Canadian Championship Match)

Yellow and red cards

International roster slots 
Montreal has ten MLS International Roster Slots for use in the 2015 season. Each club in Major League Soccer is allocated eight international roster spots and Montreal acquired the extra slots in trades with D.C. United and New York Red Bulls.

  – Player is Canadian citizen;
  – Player is U.S. citizen;
 G – Player has U.S. green card;
 C – Player has permanent Canadian residency.

Recognition

MLS Defender of the Year

MLS Top Francophone Player

MLS Best XI 2015

MLS Player of the Month

MLS Player of the Week

MLS Goal of the Week

MLS Save of the Week

MLS Team of the Week

MLS Coach of the Week

References 

2015
2015 Major League Soccer season
Canadian soccer clubs 2015 season